The 2015 Coral UK Open was a darts tournament staged by the Professional Darts Corporation. It was the thirteenth year of the tournament where, following numerous regional qualifying heats throughout Britain, players competing in a single elimination tournament to be crowned champion. The tournament was held for the second time at the Butlin's Resort in Minehead, England, between 6–8 March 2015, and had the nickname, "the FA Cup of darts" as a random draw was staged after each round until the final.

Adrian Lewis was the defending champion, having won the fourth major title of his career after beating Terry Jenkins 11–1 in the 2014 final. This year however, he was defeated in the third round after losing 9–3 to Raymond van Barneveld. Michael van Gerwen won his first UK Open title by defeating Peter Wright 11–5 in the final.

Format and qualifiers

UK Open qualifiers
There were six qualifying events staged in February 2015 to determine the UK Open Order of Merit Table. The tournament winners were:

The tournament featured 147 players. The results of the six qualifiers shown above were collated into the UK Open Order Of Merit. The top 32 players in the Order of Merit received a place at the final tournament. In addition, the next 64 players plus ties in the Order of Merit list qualified for the tournament, but started in the earlier rounds played on the Friday. A further 32 players qualified via regional qualifying tournaments.

Top 32 in Order of Merit (receiving byes into third round)

Number 33–64 of the Order of Merit (receiving byes into second round)

Remaining Order of Merit qualifiers (starting in first and preliminary round)

Riley qualifiers (starting in first and preliminary round)
32 amateur players qualified from Riley qualifiers held across the UK.

Prize money
The prize fund was increased from £250,000 to £300,000 for this year's event.

Draw

Friday 6 March

Preliminary round (best of nine legs)

First round (best of nine legs)

Second round (best of nine legs)

Third round (best of seventeen legs)

Saturday 7 March

Fourth round (best of seventeen legs)

Fifth round (best of seventeen legs)

Sunday 8 March

Quarter-finals (best of nineteen legs)

Semi-finals and Final

Media coverage
Like the 2014 tournament, the 2015 tournament was broadcast live in the UK on ITV4 and ITV4 HD.

External links
PDC netzone - results, draws, schedule

References

UK Open
UK Open
UK Open
UK Open